Fred Emery (born 19 October 1933) is a British television presenter and investigative journalist, often for the BBC.

Early life
Fred Emery was born in south-west Essex. He attended Bancroft's School in north-east London from 1944-51. He was head boy in 1951.

Career

Newspapers
Emery has had a distinguished career as a newspaper journalist. He served as a foreign correspondent covering the Vietnam War. During the 1970s he was Washington Bureau Chief for The Times throughout the Watergate scandal. He would later write a detailed history of the scandal Watergate: The Corruption of American Politics and the Fall of Richard Nixon (1994), based on extensive interviews with key participants that according to the New York Times "stands on its own as a comprehensive account of this century's most notorious political scandal." He also narrated an accompanying 5-part BBC documentary series. His archive from this research is held by Senate House Library, London.

Panorama
After leaving The Times, Emery was a presenter for the investigative current affairs programmePanorama, working on various episodes from 1978-1992. He interviewed Margaret Thatcher on 8 June 1983, on the eve of the 1983 general election. Among the episodes he presented was the controversial 1984 programme 'Maggie's Militant Tendency'. This episode would be the subject of a 1986 libel case brought by the Conservative MPs Neil Hamilton and Gerald Howarth which the BBC would eventually settle.

See also
 Channel 4 News

References

External links
 IMDb
 BFI
 Panorama
 Fred Emery's Watergate papers at the University of London

1933 births
BBC newsreaders and journalists
British investigative journalists
Panorama (British TV programme)
People educated at Bancroft's School
People from the London Borough of Southwark
Television personalities from Essex
Living people